The Bijou Awards were a Canadian award for non-feature films, launched in 1981 but presented only once before being discontinued. Created as a joint project of the Academy of Canadian Cinema and the Canadian Film and Television Association (CFTA), the awards were essentially a new home for many of the categories, particularly but not exclusively the ones for television films, that had been dropped after the old Canadian Film Awards transitioned into the Genie Awards in 1980, as well as for the CFTA's trade and craft awards in areas such as television advertising and educational films.

The ceremony was held on October 28, 1981, at Casa Loma in Toronto, Ontario, and hosted by Nancy White.

The awards were not presented in 1982, as the Academy of Canadian Cinema undertook detailed planning toward introducing permanent television awards; however, some later sources have occasionally misattributed the Bijou winners as Genie winners. In 1983, the Academy formally proposed that the Bijou Awards replace the ACTRA Awards as the primary national television award, although this did not occur and the Bijous were ultimately never presented again; instead, the Gemini Awards, the Academy's permanent awards for television production, were launched in 1986, and in 2012 the Genies and the Geminis were merged into the contemporary Canadian Screen Awards.

Winners and nominees

References

1981 in Canadian cinema
1981 in Canadian television
Awards established in 1981
Predecessors of the Canadian Screen Awards